General elections for the Legislative Council were held in Zanzibar for the first time in July 1957. It was largely a contest between the Afro-Shirazi Union and the Zanzibar Nationalist Party, with the ASU and its supporters winning five of the six contested seats. They were also the first elections to be held in East Africa.

Background
In 1926 the British colonial authorities introduced Legislative and Executive Councils to the islands, preventing the Sultan from legislating without their consent. In 1954 the number of members of the Council was expanded to 12. Two years later the British authorities appointed Walter Coutts to advise the government on how to obtain public representation on the Council, albeit as "unofficial" members. Coutts' report suggested election of six members based on a list system, with candidates limited to property owners, people over 40, and those with a specific level of education, and that voters should meet the property criteria. This proposal meant that only 14% of the islands' population were eligible to vote.

Campaign
The main parties were the Zanzibar Nationalist Party, which had been established in December 1955, and the Afro-Shirazi Union, founded in February 1957 by a merger of the African Association (founded in 1934) and the Shirazi Association (1938), whilst the Indian-dominated Muslim Association also competed.

Results
The election was characterised by significant interest, and voter turnout was 90.2%.

By constituency

Aftermath
Following the election, both the ZNP and ASU experienced infighting, resulting in some ASU members leaving to establish the Zanzibar and Pemba People's Party in 1959, and some ZNP members leaving to form the Umma Party in 1963.

In 1960 Sir Hilary Blood was appointed Constitutional Commissioner by the British authorities, with the remit to advise the government on constitutional development in Zanzibar. His proposals included making the leader of the party with the most seats Chief Minister, for ministerial portfolios to be created, for the Council to have 22 constituency-based seats, that electoral qualifications should be abolished, and that women should have the right to vote.

The British government accepted Blood's proposals, and fresh elections were held in January 1961.

References

Zanzibar
Elections in Tanzania
1957 in Zanzibar
Politics of Zanzibar